Bhakta Prahlada is a 1942 Telugu-language film produced by Sobhanachal Banners and directed by Chitrapu Narayana Rao. The film follows Prahlada, a devotee of Vishnu in Hinduism. This is the second film based on the same story, but with more advanced technicians. The story is about the devotee prahlada.

Cast 
Vemuri Gaggaiah
 Rajeswari
 Narayan Rao
 G. Varalakshmi

See also 
 Bhakta Prahlada (1932), The first Telugu talkie and old Bhakta Prahlada movie

References

External links 
 History of Bhakta Prahlada movies in telugu
 

1942 films
1940s Telugu-language films
Films about Prahlada
Films directed by Chitrapu Narayana Rao
Indian musical drama films
1940s musical drama films
Indian black-and-white films
1942 drama films
Films based on the Bhagavata Purana